The 2011 Dubai Tennis Championships (also known as the 2011 Dubai Duty Free Tennis Championships for sponsorship reasons) was a 500 Series event on the 2011 ATP World Tour and a Premier 5 event on the 2011 WTA Tour. Both of the events took place at the Aviation Club Tennis Centre in Dubai, United Arab Emirates. The women's tournament took place from February 14 to February 20, 2011, while the men's tournament took place from February 21 to February 27, 2011.

ATP entrants

Seeds

1 Rankings are as of February 14, 2011.

Other entrants
The following players received wildcards into the main draw:
 Omar Awadhy
 Michael Berrer
 Somdev Devvarman

The following players received entry from the qualifying draw:

 Karol Beck
 Sergei Bubka
 Grigor Dimitrov
 Lukáš Rosol

WTA entrants

Seeds

1 Rankings are as of February 7, 2011.

Other entrants
The following players received wildcards into the main draw:
 Jelena Dokić
 Bojana Jovanovski
 Sania Mirza

The following players received entry from the qualifying draw:

 Kristina Barrois
 Zuzana Kučová
 Nuria Llagostera Vives
 Ayumi Morita
 Anastasia Pavlyuchenkova
 Peng Shuai
 Chanelle Scheepers
 Zhang Shuai

Champions

Men's singles

 Novak Djokovic def.  Roger Federer, 6–3, 6–3
It was Djokovic's 2nd title of the year and 20th of his career. It was his 3rd consecutive Dubai title.

Women's singles

 Caroline Wozniacki def.  Svetlana Kuznetsova, 6–1, 6–3.
It was Wozniacki's 1st title of the year and 13th of her career. It was her 1st Premier 5 title of the year and 3rd of her career.

Men's doubles

 Sergiy Stakhovsky /  Mikhail Youzhny def.  Jérémy Chardy /  Feliciano López, 4–6, 6–3, [10–3]

Women's doubles

 Liezel Huber /  María José Martínez Sánchez def.  Květa Peschke /  Katarina Srebotnik, 7–6(5), 6–3.

References

External links
 Official website

 
2011
Dubai Tennis Championships
Dubai Tennis Championships